The Confidence Game is a 2016 book by Maria Konnikova. It explains the psychology of con artists - how fraudsters know how to manipulate human emotions.

References

2016 non-fiction books
Popular psychology books
Viking Press books